School the Indie Rockers is the second studio album from nerdcore band Optimus Rhyme, released July 1, 2006.

Track listing
All songs written by Optimus Rhyme, lyrics by Wheelie Cyberman, produced by Jack Endino

 "Extinguish" - 0:29
 "LEDs" - 3:45
 "Sick Day" - 2:48
 "My Piroshky" - 2:33
 "Just Forget It" - 3:24
 "Ping Pong Song" - 3:04
 "Ergonomic" - 4:17
 "Who Me?" - 1:38
 "Autobeat Airbus" - 2:59
 "Super Shiny Metal" - 4:22
 "Obey the moderator" - 2:57
 "Coded & United" - 5:09
 "My Piroshky (Reprise)" - 0:46

Personnel
Wheelie Cyberman – lead vocals
Powerthighs – guitar
Stumblebee – bass
Grimrock – drums

References

Optimus Rhyme albums
2006 albums
Albums produced by Jack Endino